Sarah Moore Grimké (1792–1873) and Angelina Emily Grimké (1805–1879), known as the Grimké sisters, were the first nationally-known white American female advocates of abolition of slavery and women's rights. They were speakers, writers, and educators.

They grew up in a slave-owning family in South Carolina, and in their twenties, became part of Philadelphia’s substantial Quaker society. They became deeply involved with the abolitionist movement, traveling on its lecture circuit and recounting their firsthand experiences with slavery on their family's plantation. Among the first American women to act publicly in social reform movements, they were ridiculed for their abolitionist activity. They became early activists in the women's rights movement. They eventually founded a private school.

After discovering that their late brother had had three mixed-race sons, whose mother was one of his slaves, they helped the boys get education in the North. Archibald and Francis J. Grimké stayed in the North, Francis becoming a Presbyterian minister, but their younger brother John returned to the South.

Early life and education
Judge John Faucheraud Grimké, the father of the Grimké sisters, was strong advocate of slavery.  A wealthy planter who held hundreds of slaves, Grimké had 14 children with his wife and had at least three children from enslaved women. (See Children of the plantation.) Three of the children died in infancy. Grimké served as chief judge of the Supreme Court of South Carolina.

Sarah was the sixth child, and Angelina was the thirteenth. Sarah said that at age five after she saw a slave being whipped, she tried to board a steamer to a place where there was no slavery. Later, in violation of the law, she taught her personal slave to read.

Sarah wanted to become a lawyer and follow in her father's footsteps. She studied the books in her father's library constantly, teaching herself geography, history, and mathematics, but her father would not allow her to learn Latin, or go to college with her brother Thomas, who was at Yale Law School.  Still, her father appreciated her keen intelligence, and told her that if she had been a man, she would have been the greatest lawyer in South Carolina.

After completing her studies, Sarah begged her parents to allow her to become Angelina's godmother. She became a role model to her younger sibling, and the two sisters had a close relationship all their lives.  Angelina often called Sarah "mother".

Sarah became an abolitionist in 1835.

Social activism

Sarah was twenty-six when she accompanied her father, who was in need of medical attention, to Philadelphia, Pennsylvania, where she became acquainted with the Quakers.  The Quakers had liberal views on slavery and gender equality, and Sarah was fascinated with their religious sincerity and simplicity, and also their disapproval of gender inequality and slavery. Because of her father's death, Sarah had to leave Philadelphia in 1818 and return to Charleston. There her abolitionist views grew stronger, while she also influenced Angelina.

Sarah left Charleston for good in 1821, and relocated to Philadelphia, where Angelina joined her in 1829. The sisters became very involved in the Quaker community. In 1835 Angelina wrote a letter to Wm. Lloyd Garrison, editor and publisher of The Liberator, which he published without her permission. As Quakers of the time were strict on traditional manners, as well as on individuals' deference to all decisions of the congregation before taking public actions, both sisters were immediately rebuked by the Quaker community — yet sought out by the abolitionist movement. The sisters had to choose: recant and become members in good standing in the Quaker community, or actively work to oppose slavery. They chose the latter course.

Alice S. Rossi says that this choice "seemed to free both sisters for a rapidly escalating awareness of the many restrictions upon their lives. Their physical and intellectual energies were soon fully expanded, as though they and their ideas had been suddenly released after a long period of germination." Abolitionist Theodore Weld, who would later marry Angelina, trained them to be abolition speakers. Contact with like-minded individuals for the first time in their lives enlivened the sisters.

Sarah was rebuked again in 1836 by Quakers when she tried to discuss abolition in a meeting. Following the earlier example of the African-American orator Maria. W. Stewart of Boston, the Grimké sisters were among the first female public speakers in the United States. They first spoke to "parlor meetings," of women only, as was considered proper. Interested men frequently sneaked into the meetings. The sisters gained attention because of their class and background in having slaves, and coming from a wealthy planter family.

As they attracted larger audiences, the Grimké sisters began to speak in front of mixed audiences (both men and women). They challenged social conventions in two ways: first, speaking for the antislavery movement at a time when it was not popular to do so; many male public speakers on this issue were criticized in the press. Secondly, their very act of public speaking was criticized, as it was not believed suitable for women. A group of ministers wrote a letter citing the Bible and reprimanding the sisters for stepping out of the "woman's proper sphere," which was characterized by silence and subordination. They came to understand that women were oppressed and, without power, women could not address or right the wrongs of society. They became ardent feminists.

Angelina Grimké wrote her first tract, Appeal to the Christian Women of the South (1836), to encourage Southern women to join the abolitionist movement for the sake of white womanhood as well as black slaves. She addressed Southern women in sisterly, reasonable tones. She began her piece by demonstrating that slavery was contrary to the United States' Declaration of Independence and to the teachings of Christ. She discussed the damage both to slaves and to society. She advocated teaching slaves to read, and freeing any slaves her readers might own. Although legal codes of slave states restricted or prohibited both of these actions, she urged her readers to ignore wrongful laws and do what was right. "Consequences, my friends, belong no more to you than they did to [the] apostles. Duty is ours and events are God's." She closed by exhorting her readers to "arise and gird yourselves for this great moral conflict."

The sisters created more controversy when Sarah published Epistle to the Clergy of the Southern States (1836) and Angelina republished her Appeal in 1837. That year they went on a lecture tour, addressing Congregationalist churches in the Northeast. In addition to denouncing slavery, the sisters denounced race prejudice. Further, they argued that (white) women had a natural bond with female black slaves. These last two ideas were extreme even for radical abolitionists.  Their public speaking for the abolitionist cause continued to draw criticism, each attack making the Grimké sisters more determined. Responding to an attack by Catharine Beecher on her public speaking, Angelina wrote a series of letters to Beecher, later published with the title Letters to Catharine Beecher. She staunchly defended the abolitionist cause and her right to publicly speak for that cause. By the end of the year, the sisters were being denounced from Congregationalist pulpits. The following year Sarah responded to the ministers' attacks by writing a series of letters addressed to the president of the abolitionist society which sponsored their speeches. These became known as Letters on the Equality of the Sexes, in which she defended women's right to the public platform.  By 1838, thousands of people flocked to hear their Boston lecture series.

In 1839 the sisters, with Weld, published American Slavery as It Is: Testimony of a Thousand Witnesses, a collection of eyewitness testimony and stories from Southern newspapers.

Until 1854, Theodore was often away from home, either on the lecture circuit or in Washington, DC. After that, financial pressures forced him to take up a more lucrative profession. For a time they lived on a farm in New Jersey and operated a boarding school. Many abolitionists, including Elizabeth Cady Stanton, sent their children to the school. Eventually, it developed as a cooperative, the Raritan Bay Union. Although the sisters no longer spoke on the lecture circuit, they continued to be privately active as both abolitionists and feminists.

Neither Sarah nor Angelina initially sought to become feminists, but felt the role was forced onto them.  Devoutly religious, these Quaker converts' works are predominantly religious in nature, with strong Biblical arguments. Indeed, both their abolitionist sentiments and their feminism sprang from deeply-held religious convictions. Both Sarah, who eventually emphasized feminism over abolitionism, and Angelina, who remained primarily interested in the abolitionist movement, were powerful writers. They neatly summarized the abolitionist arguments which would eventually lead to the Civil War. Sarah's work addressed many issues that are familiar to the feminist movement of the late 20th century, 150 years later.

Before the Civil War, the sisters discovered that their late brother Henry had had a relationship with Nancy Weston, an enslaved mixed-race woman, after he became a widower. They lived together and had three mixed-race sons: Archibald, Francis, and John (who was born a couple of months after their father died). The sisters arranged for the oldest two nephews to come north for education and helped support them. Francis J. Grimké became a Presbyterian minister who graduated from Lincoln University (Pennsylvania) and Princeton Theological Seminary. In December 1878, Francis married Charlotte Forten, a noted educator and author, and had one daughter, Theodora Cornelia, who died as an infant. The daughter of Archibald, Angelina Weld Grimké (named after her aunt), became a noted poet.

When Sarah was nearly 80, to test the 15th Amendment, the sisters attempted to vote.

Selections from writings
Although Angelina's letter was published before Sarah's work, analysis of the texts and the sisters' large body of work demonstrate that much of Angelina's analysis of the creation story originally came from Sarah.  Although the two sisters shared the same interpretation of the creation story, their discussions of it are very different.  Angelina uses her interpretation of the creation story to bolster her position that women were not created as a gift or for possession of men but rather as unique, intelligent, capable, creatures deserving equal regard, rights, and responsibilities with men.

Sarah's discussion of the creation story is much longer, more detailed, and more sophisticated. Both stories emphasize the equality of men and women's creation but Sarah also discusses Adam's greater responsibility for the fall. To her, Eve, innocent of the ways of evil, was tempted by the crafty serpent while Adam was tempted by a mere mortal. Because of the supernatural nature of her tempter, Eve's sinfulness can be more easily forgiven. Further, Adam should have tenderly reproved his wife and led them both away from sin. Hence, Adam failed in two ways, not one. By analyzing the Hebrew text and by comparing the phrasing used here with the phrasing used in the story of Cain and Abel, Sarah found that God's "curse" is not a curse but a prophecy. Her concluding thought asserts that women are bound to God alone.

From Angelina Grimke's "Letter XII Human Rights Not Founded on Sex" (October 2, 1837):

The regulation of duty by the mere circumstance of sex, rather than by the fundamental principle of moral being, has led to all that multifarious train of evils flowing out of the anti-christian doctrine of masculine and feminine virtues. By this doctrine, man had been converted into the warrior, and clothed with sternness, and those other kindred qualities, which in common estimation belong to his character as a man; whilst woman has been taught to lean upon an arm of flesh, to sit as a doll arrayed in "gold, and pearls, and costly array," to be admired for her personal charms, and caressed and humored like a spoiled child, or converted into a mere drudge to suit the convenience of her lord and master. Thus have all the diversified relations of life been filled with "confusion and every evil work." This principle has given to man a charter for the exercise of tyranny and selfishness, pride and arrogance, lust and brutal violence. It has robbed woman of essential rights, the right to think and speak and act on all great moral questions, just as men think and speak and act; the right to share their responsibilities, perils and toils; the right to fulfill the great end of her being, as a moral, intellectual and immortal creature, and of glorifying god in her body and her spirit which are His. Hitherto, instead of being a help meet to man, in the highest, noblest sense of the term as a companion, a co-worker, an equal; she has been a mere appendage of his being, an instrument of his convenience and pleasure, the pretty toy with which he whiled away his leisure moments, or the pet animal whom he humored into playfulness and submission. Woman, instead of being regarded as the equal of man, has uniformly been looked down upon as his inferior, a mere gift to fill up the measure of his happiness. In "the poetry of romantic gallantry," it is true, she has been called "the last best gift of God to man"; but I believe I speak forth the words of truth and soberness when I affirm, that woman never was given to man. She was created, like him, in the image of God, and crowned with glory and honor; created only a little lower than the angels, - not, as is almost universally assumed, a little lower than man; on her brow, as well as on his, was placed the "diadem of beauty," and in her hand the scepter of universal dominion. Gen 1: 27, 28. "The last best gift of God to man"! Where is the scripture warrant for this "rhetorical flourish, this splendid absurdity?" Let us examine the account of the creation. "And the rib which the Lord God had taken from man, made he a woman, and brought her unto the man." Not as a gift – for Adam immediately recognized her as part of himself – ("this is now bone of my bone, and flesh of my flesh") – a companion and equal, not one hair's breadth beneath him in the majesty and glory of her moral being; not placed under his authority as a subject, but by his side, on the same platform of human rights, under the government of God only. This idea of woman's being "the last gift of God to man," however pretty it may sound to the ears of those who love to discourse upon. " The poetry of romantic gallantry, and the generous promptings of chivalry," has nevertheless been the means of sinking her from an end into a mere means – of turning her into an appendage to man, instead of recognizing her as a part of man – of destroying her individuality, and rights, and responsibilities, and merging her moral being in that of man. Instead of Jehovah being her king, her lawgiver, her judge, she has been taken out of the exalted scale of existence in which He placed her, and subjected to the despotic control of man.

As an added bonus, Angelina also wrote: ". . . whatever is morally right for a man to do, it is morally right for a woman to do. I recognize no rights but human rights – I know nothing of men's rights and women's rights; for in Christ Jesus, there is neither male nor female.

... I prize the purity of his character as highly as I do that of hers. As a moral being, whatever it is morally wrong for her to do, it is morally wrong for him to do.

From Sarah Grimke's "Letter 1: The Original Equality of Woman" July 11, 1837. Sarah precedes the following quote with the comment that all translations are corrupt and the only inspired versions of the Bible are in the original languages.

We must first view woman at the period of her creation. "And God said, Let us make man in our own image, after our likeness; and let them have dominion over the fish of the sea, and the fowl of the air, and over the cattle, and over all the earth, and over every creeping thing, in the image of God created he him, male and female created he them." In all this sublime description of the creation of man, (which is a difference intimated as existing between them). They were both made in the image of God; dominion was given to both over every other creature, but not over each other. Created in perfect equality, they were expected to exercise the viceregency intrusted to them by their Maker, in harmony and love.

Let us pass on now to the recapitulation of the creation of man:  "The Lord god formed man of the dust of the ground, and breathed into his nostrils the breath of life; and man became a living soul. And the Lord God said, it is not good that man should be alone, I will make him an help meet for him." All creation swarmed with animated beings capable of natural affection, as we know they still are; it was not, therefore, merely to give man a creature susceptible of loving, obeying, and looking up to him, for all that the animals could do and did do. It was to give him a companion, in all respects his equal; one who was like himself a free agent, gifted with intellect and endowed with immortality; not a partaker merely of his animal gratifications, but able to enter into all his feelings as a moral and responsible being. If this had not been the case, how could she have been a help meet for him? I understand this as applying not only to the parties entering into the marriage contract, but to all men and women, because I believe God designed woman to be a help meet for man in every good and perfect work. She was part of himself, as if Jehovah designed to make the oneness and identity of man and woman perfect and complete; and when the glorious work of their creation was finished, "the morning stars sang together, and all the sons of God shouted for joy.

This blissful condition was not long enjoyed by our first parents. Eve, it would seem from history, was wandering alone amid the bowers of Paradise, when the serpent met with her. From her reply to Satan, it is evident that the command not to eat "of the tree that is in the midst of the garden," was given to both, although the term man was used when the prohibition was issued by God. "And the woman said unto the serpent, we may eat of the fruit of the trees of the garden, but of the fruit of the tree which is in the midst of the garden, God hath said, Ye shall not eat of it, neither shall Ye touch it, lest Ye die." Here the woman was exposed to temptation from a being with whom she was unacquainted. She had been accustomed to associate with her beloved partner, and to hold communion with God and with angels; but of satanic intelligence, she was in all probability entirely ignorant. Through the subtlety of the serpent, she was beguiled. And "when she was that the tree was good for food, and that it was pleasant to the eyes, and a tree to be desired to make one wise, she took of the fruit thereof and did eat.

We next find Adam involved in the same sin, not through the instrumentality of a super-natural agent, but through that of his equal, a being whom he must have known was liable to transgress the divine command, because he must have felt that he was himself a free agent, and that he was restrained from disobedience only by the exercise of faith and love towards his Creator. Had Adam tenderly reproved his wife, and endeavored to lead her to repentance instead of sharing in her guilt, I should be much more ready to accord to man that superiority which he claims; but as the facts stand disclosed by the sacred historian, it appears to men that to say the least, there was as much weakness exhibited by Adam as by Eve. They both fell from innocence, and consequently from happiness, but not from equality.

Let us next examine the conduct of this fallen pair, when Jehovah interrogated them respecting their fault. They both frankly confessed their guilt. "The man said, the woman who thou gavest to be with me, she gave me of the tree and I did eat. And the woman said, the serpent beguiled men and I did eat." And the Lord God said unto the woman, "Thou wilt be subject unto they husband, and he will rule over thee." That this did not allude to the subjection of woman to man is manifest, because the same mode of expression is used in speaking to Cain of Abel. The truth is that the curse, as it is termed, which was pronounced by Jehovah upon woman, is a simple prophecy. The Hebrew, like the French language, uses the same word to express shall and will. Our translators having been accustomed to exercise their lordship over their wives, and seeing only through the medium of a perverted judgment, very naturally, though I think not very learnedly or very kindly, translated it shall instead of will, and thus converted a prediction to Eve into a command to Adam; for observe, it is addressed to the woman and not to the man. the consequence of the fall was an immediate struggle for dominion, and Jehovah foretold which would gain the ascendancy; but as he created them in his image, as that image manifestly was not lost by the fall, because it is urged in Gen 9:6, as an argument why the life of man should not be taken by his fellow man, there is no reason to suppose that sin produced any distinction between them as moral, intellectual, and responsible beings. Man might just as well have endeavored by hard labor to fulfill the prophecy, thorns and thistles will the earth bring forth to thee, as to pretend to accomplish the other, "he will rule over thee," by asserting dominion over his wife.

Authority usurped from God, not give.
He gave him only over beast, flesh, fowl,
Dominion absolute: that right he holds
By God's donation: but man o'er woman
He made not Lord, such title to himself
Reserving, human left from human free,

Here then I plant myself. God created us equal; – he created us free agents; – he is our Lawgiver, our King, and our Judge, and to him alone is woman bound to be in subjection, and to him alone is she accountable for the use of those talents with which Her Heavenly Father has entrusted her. One is her Master even Christ.

In response to a letter from a group of ministers who cited the Bible in reprimanding the sisters for stepping out of "woman's proper sphere" of silence and subordination, Sarah Grimke' wrote Letters on the Equality of the Sexes and the Condition of Woman in 1838.

She asserts that "men and women were CREATED EQUAL.... Whatever is right for a man to do, is right for woman....I seek no favors for my sex. I surrender not our claim to equality. All I ask of our brethren is, that they will take their feet from off our necks and permit us to stand upright on that ground which God destined us to occupy."

Legacy
"The Grimké Sisters at Work on Theodore Dwight Weld's American Slavery as It Is (1838)" is a poem by Melissa Range published in the September 30, 2019, issue of The Nation.

Archival material
The papers of the Grimké family are in the South Carolina Historical Society, Charleston, South Carolina. The Weld–Grimké papers are William L. Clements Library, University of Michigan, Ann Arbor, Michigan.

References
Notes

Bibliography

Ceplair, Larry, Editor. The Public Years of Sarah and Angelina Grimké: Selected Writings 1835–1839. Columbia University Press, New York, 1989.

Lerner, Gerda, The Grimke Sisters From South Carolina: Pioneers for Women's Rights and Abolition. New York, Schocken Books, 1971 and The University of North Carolina Press, Cary, North Carolina, 1998. 
Perry, Mark E. Lift Up Thy Voice: The Grimke Family's Journey from Slaveholders to Civil Rights Leaders. New York: Viking Penguin, 2002 
U.S. National Park Service. "Grimke Sisters" Women's Rights National Historic Park website, U.S. Department of the Interior.

Willimon, William H. Turning the World Upside Down; the story of Sarah and Angelina Grimké. Sandlapper Press, 1972

Further reading

External links

Letters on the Equality of the Sexes; Letters to Catharine E. Beecher Sunshine for Women, 2000.
An Epistle to the Clergy of the Southern States, Sarah Grimké, 1836.
Grimké sisters’ anti-slavery message revived in Massachusetts state house NECN.com
Angelina and Sarah Grimke: Abolitionist Sisters by Carol Berkin, The Gilder Lehrman Institute of American History
http://wn.com/grimke_sisters
http://utc.iath.virginia.edu/abolitn/abesaegat.html

American abolitionists
American feminists
Writers from Charleston, South Carolina
19th-century Quakers
American Quakers
Grimké family
Sisters
Lecturers
Writers from Philadelphia